Havilah is an unincorporated community in Kern County, California.

History

Early
Asbury Harpending arrived in the area where there were many southern-sympathizers in 1864. After finding gold deposits on Clear Creek, a tributary of the Kern River, the group claimed a townsite on the road from Keyesville to Tehachapi and named it after the Biblical land of Havilah, "where there is gold" according to Genesis 2:11. By the end of 1865, Havilah was a boom town with 147 business buildings, thirteen saloons, and a population of nearly a thousand, mostly miners working the Clear Creek Mining District.

Havilah was the county seat at the founding of Kern County on April 2, 1866, and the county's first newspaper, the Havilah Courier, began publication that same year. The county government was moved to Bakersfield in 1874.

A post office operated at Havilah from 1866 to 1918. The Havilah School District, formed in 1866, was the first public school in Kern County.

Nearby historic mining communities include Loraine, (originally named Paris) and Twin Oaks. The town is now registered as California Historical Landmark #100.

Modern
Aside from the Old Havilah Cemetery, little remains from the original settlement, most of which was destroyed by fires in the 1920s. A replica of the courthouse and one-room schoolhouse have been constructed near their original locations. The sides of Caliente-Bodfish Road in Havilah are lined with signs marking where other historic buildings once stood.

Accessible by car, Havilah is just over  driving distance from the intersection of State Route 58 and Caliente-Bodfish Road. It is just over five driving miles from Bodfish on Caliente-Bodfish Road.

The US Geological Survey plots several mines nearby. Names of local mines include:
 Southern Cross Mine
 Friday Mine
 Uncle Sam Mine
 McKeadney Mine

Districts, zones, boundaries, and services
The ZIP Code is 93518, and the community is inside area code 661. Havilah shares its postal ZIP Code with the nearby communities of Caliente and Loraine. The community is within the Kern County Air Pollution Control District.

The area is bordered to the east and west by Sequoia National Forest lands and is located at the junction of Havilah Canyon and Haight Canyon. Havilah Canyon runs roughly north-south and mountain peaks to the east and west are over  higher than the roadway, which runs along the floor of Havilah Canyon. King Solomons Ridge lies to the east; Hobo Ridge lies to the west. Snow may be present during winter months.

The community falls within the Battalion 7 area of the Kern County Fire Department. It is listed by the California Fire Alliance as being at high risk to wildfire.

Commercial electric power is supplied by Southern California Edison.

California Historical Landmark
The California Historical Landmark reads:
NO. 100 HAVILAH - Gold deposits at Havilah were discovered in 1864. Havilah was the county seat between 1866, when Kern County was organized, and 1872, when the government was moved to Bakersfield. Havilah was an active mining center for more than 20 years, and there are still some operating mines in this vicinity.

A state plaque is located at 10 Miller St. in Bodfish, California. A private plaque is at 6789 Caliente-Bodfish Rd., Havilah, California.

See also
California Historical Landmarks in Kern County
California Historical Landmark

References

External links

 

Unincorporated communities in Kern County, California
Former county seats in California
Unincorporated communities in California
California Historical Landmarks